The heavyweight competition was the second-highest weight class featured in amateur boxing at the 2008 Summer Olympics, and was held at the Workers Indoor Arena. Heavyweights were limited to a maximum of 91 kilograms in body mass.

Like all Olympic boxing events, the competition was a straight single-elimination tournament. Both semifinal losers were awarded bronze medals, so no boxers competed again after their first loss. Bouts consisted of four rounds of two minutes each, with one-minute breaks between rounds. Punches scored only if the white area on the front of the glove made full contact with the front of the head or torso of the opponent. Five judges scored each bout; three of the judges had to signal a scoring punch within one second for the punch to score. The winner of the bout was the boxer who scored the most valid punches by the end of the bout.

This was the first time since 1968 that Cuba did not win the gold medal in this weight class while it was participating (i.e. excluding boycotts in 1984 and 1988).

Medalists

Draw
All times are China Standard Time (UTC+8)

See also
2009 World Amateur Boxing Championships – Heavyweight

External links 
 AIBA
 Results

Boxing at the 2008 Summer Olympics